The Jim Jim Falls (Aboriginal: Barrkmalam) is a plunge waterfall on the Jim Jim Creek that descends over the Arnhem Land escarpment within the UNESCO World Heritagelisted Kakadu National Park in the Northern Territory of Australia. The Jim Jim Falls area is registered on the Australian National Heritage List.

Etymology
The English name "Jim Jim Falls" comes from the local Kundjeyhmi word andjimdjim, referring to the water pandanus (Pandanus aquaticus), a native plant. Andjimdjim (or mandjimdjim in the neighbouring Kunwinjku language) lines the creek below Jim Jim Falls.

Location and features
In the dry season, access from the Kakadu Highway is possible via a  gravel road, with the final  suitable for four-wheel drive vehicles only. However, during much of this period the falls dry up and do not flow. In the wet season when the falls are at their most spectacular, it is impossible to drive any vehicle into the area and are best viewed from the air together with the nearby Twin Falls.

140 million years, ago much of Kakadu was under a shallow sea. The prominent escarpment wall formed sea cliffs and the Arnhem Land plateau formed a flat land above the sea. It varies from vertical cliffs in the Jim Jim Falls area to stepped cliffs and isolated outliers in the north.

In popular culture
"Jim Jim Falls" is the first track on English singer Morrissey's album I Am Not A Dog On A Chain

See also

 List of reduplicated Australian place names
 List of waterfalls of the Northern Territory
 Protected areas of the Northern Territory

References

External links

 Tourist Information  Kakadu National Park
 Google Map Map of Kakadu National Park with major camp sites

Waterfalls of the Northern Territory
Kakadu National Park
Arnhem Land
Plunge waterfalls